Prodotto agroalimentare tradizionale (PAT) is an official approval for traditional Italian regional food products similar to the Protected Geographical Status of the European Union. A list of approved products is published by the Ministry of Agricultural, Food and Forestry Policies. It lists only products that do not qualify for pan-European approval, and as such PAT is only applicable within Italy.

The denomination is attributed by each regional government, in collaboration with the Ministry of Agricultural, Food and Forestry Policies. 

In 2019 a total of 5128 products carried PAT certification; the region with the largest number of approved products was Campania, with 531.

Classification 
PAT products are classified in ten categories: drinks; meats; condiments; cheeses; oils and fats; vegetables and vegetable products; pasta, bread and patisserie; delicatessen; fish and seafood; and products of animal origin other than those above.

See also
 List of Italian products with protected designation of origin
Denominazione di origine controllata
Denominazione comunale d'origine

References

Appellations
Law of Italy
Italian cuisine